"Heart Flow" is a song by Belgian dance singer Kate Ryan. It's Ryan's second non-album single released on 13 August 2013. It's also the anthem of the World Outgames 2013.

It has no official video, but an Artwork video is available via YouTube.

Track listing 
Digital download – single

"Heart Flow" – 4:04

References 

2013 singles
Kate Ryan songs
2013 songs
Songs written by Kate Ryan
Songs written by Thomas G:son
Songs written by Negin Djafari